Olševek (in older sources also Viševek) is a village in the Municipality of Šenčur in the Upper Carniola region of Slovenia.

The local church is dedicated to Saint Michael.

References

External links

Olševek at Geopedia

Populated places in the Municipality of Šenčur